50 Signs of Mental Illness: A Guide to Understanding Mental Health is a 2005 book by psychiatrist James Whitney Hicks published by Yale University Press. The book is designed as an accessible psychiatric reference for non-professionals that describes symptoms, treatments and strategies for understanding mental health.

A review in the American Journal of Psychiatry commended its phrasing of acceptable ways to speak about mental illness.

List of signs
The 50 signs covered in the book are:
 
 Anger
 Antisocial Behavior
 Anxiety
 Appetite disturbances
 Avoidance
 Body image problems
 Compulsions
 Confusion
 Craving
 Deceitfulness
 Delusions
 Denial
 Depression
 Dissociation
 Euphoria
 Fatigue
 Fears
 Flashbacks
 Grandiosity
 Grief
 Hallucinations
 Histrionics
 Hyperactivity
 Identity confusion
 Impulsiveness
 Intoxication
 Jealousy
 Learning difficulties
 Mania
 Memory loss
 Mood swings
 Movement problems
 Nonsense
 Obsessions
 Oddness
 Panic
 Paranoia
 Physical complaints and pain
 Psychosis
 Religious preoccupations
 Self-esteem problems
 Self-mutilation
 Sexual performance problems
 Sexual preoccupations
 Sleep problems
 Sloppiness
 Speech difficulties
 Stress
 Suicidal thoughts
 Psychological trauma

References

Further reading
 Bardi, C. A. (2005). The Promise And Perils Of Psychological Self-Help. PsycCRITIQUES, 50(51). 
 Lieberman, E. J. (2005, April 15). Book Review. Library Journal, 130(7): 107.
 Mott, G. (2005, March 29). How Sick Is Your Thinking Really? Washington Post, HE02.
 Regan, M. B. (2005, April 1). Understanding mental illness. Baltimore Sun.
 American Psychiatric Association (July, 2018)

External links
 Official site
 Yale University Press

2005 non-fiction books
Books about mental health